Dimitri A. Flowers (born January 20, 1996) is a former American football fullback. He played college football at Oklahoma.

College career
Flowers was an early enrollee at Oklahoma and was injured in the spring game but was healthy for his freshman season. On November 3, 2016, Flowers had 22 carries for 115 yards in a 34-24 win against Iowa State. As a senior in 2017, Flowers started 13 of 14 games ad made 26 catches for 464 yards and five touchdowns, in addition to 22 rushing yards and four rushing touchdowns. He was a First-team All-Big 12 selection. In his career, Flowers had 36 rushes for 151 yards and four touchdowns, as well as 54 receptions for 886 yards and 13 touchdowns.

Professional career

New York Jets
Flowers was signed by the New York Jets as an undrafted free agent on May 4, 2018. He was waived on August 31, 2018.

Jacksonville Jaguars
On October 10, 2018, Flowers was signed to the Jacksonville Jaguars practice squad, but was released the next day. He was re-signed on December 18, 2018. He was promoted to the active roster on December 28, 2018. He was waived on May 9, 2019.

Dallas Renegades
Flowers was picked in the tenth round of the 2020 XFL Draft by the Dallas Renegades. He was placed on injured reserve on January 13, 2020. He had his contract terminated when the league suspended operations on April 10, 2020.

Personal life
Dimitri is the son of Erik Flowers, a former NFL defensive end who was a first round pick of the Buffalo Bills in 2000. His cousin, Tre Flowers, is a former Oklahoma State safety who was drafted by the Seattle Seahawks in the 2018 draft.

References

External links
Jacksonville Jaguars bio
Oklahoma Sooners bio

1996 births
Living people
Dallas Renegades players
Jacksonville Jaguars players
Oklahoma Sooners football players
Players of American football from San Antonio
New York Jets players